The Lion Hunt is a series of oil on canvas paintings produced by the French artist Eugène Delacroix in the mid-1800s.

Delacroix often painted hunting scenes and animals fighting. Like many other artists of the romantic era, he was fascinated by oriental and exotic locales. In 1832 he made a long trip to Morocco that provided lasting inspiration for his work. In large, colourful paintings, lions, tigers, and hunters on horseback fight to the Death. But Delacroix had most likely never seen such scenes, nor even wild animals in their natural habitat (although Barbary lion was not extinct in Morocco until the 1960s). Instead, he used detailed studies of animals in zoos and of the people and material culture of North Africa to create his pictures.

The dramatism so typical of Romanticism is created here by energetic brushstrokes and the contrast of complementary colours - red and green, blue and orange - and bright and dark patches. The Lion Hunt, painted more than twenty years after his expedition to Morocco, was also influenced by the hunt pictures of the seventeenth-century master Peter Paul Rubens, such as The Lion Hunt.

The most monumental version of the series is the Musée des Beaux-Arts de Bordeaux version from 1855 whose top half was severely damaged during a fire in 1870. Delacroix made at least two sketches of the painting, which now are in the collections at Musée d'Orsay and Nationalmuseum respectively. Later he did similar paintings which now are in the Collections of the Museum of Fine Arts in Boston and Art Institute of Chicago.

Paintings in the series (and similar paintings)

References

Paintings by Eugène Delacroix
1855 paintings
Paintings in the collection of the Musée d'Orsay
Paintings in the collection of the Nationalmuseum Stockholm
Paintings in the collection of the Art Institute of Chicago
Paintings in the collection of the Museum of Fine Arts, Boston
Paintings in the collection of the Hermitage Museum
Paintings in Nouvelle-Aquitaine
Horses in art
Hunting in art
Lions in art